This is a list of domes in France.

Paris

Cupolas on the Corner of Buildings

Blois

Grenoble

Lyon

Melun

Nantes

Nice

Saumur

Strasbourg

Toulouse 
Hôpital de La Grave)

Tours

See also 

 List of Roman domes

References

Domes
List of Domes in France